Maha Danvil is a village in the North Western Province of Sri Lanka. It has two temples.

Populated places in North Western Province, Sri Lanka